The Wanjiwalku were an indigenous Australian people of the state of New South Wales.

Language
Norman Tindale, who had worked intensely with his informant George Dutton on the Wanjiwalku language, argued that, though separate tribes, both the Wanjiwalku and their western neighbours, the Malyangapa, spoke the same dialect. Later studies by Luise Hercus and Peter Austin have determined that Wanjiwalku was a dialect of Paakantyi, while Malyangapa was morphological almost identical to the language spoken by the Yardliyawara, and to be classified as a member of the Yarli dialect cluster.

Country
Their lands took in Yancannia and the area east of Lake Bancannia.

Edward Micklethwaite Curr describing the tough environment of Wanjiwalku lands wrote that the earliest white explorer Charles Sturt almost expired there:-
The country of the Pono forms a portion of the interior traversed by Captain Sturt in 1845 and described in such dismal colours as destined to be for ever uninhabitable by civilized people. It was here that, living in an underground room as a protection against the intense heat, his nails ceased to grow; the hairs of his head split at the end; Lucifer matches dropped, from the hand, light of themselves on reaching the ground, and so on; and yet this country has been found for several years to make good sheep-runs.

Alternative names
 Weyneubulkoo
 Wonipalku
 Wanyabalku
 Wonjimalku
 Pono
 Pernowie, Pernowrie
 Kongait
 Tongaranka

Some words
  (kangaroo)
  (tame dog)
  (wild dog)
  (father)
  (mother)
  (white man)

See also
 Peoples of Palawan
 Pallar
 Pallas
 Antisuyu
 Pelasgians
 Aboriginal Tasmanians

Notes

Citations

Sources

Aboriginal peoples of New South Wales